343 is a year of the Christian or Common Era.

343 may also refer to:

 343 BC, the year
 343 (number), the integer represented by the English-language numeral "three hundred and forty-three"

Vehicles
 Three Forty Three, a New York City fireboat
 Volvo 343, a small family car
 Fiat 343, a bus

Other uses
 343 Guilty Spark, a fictional character from the Halo franchise
 343 Industries, a Microsoft video game studio responsible for the Halo franchise, named after this character
 Area code 343, a phone number area code for Ottawa, Ontario, Canada
 Highway 343, a list of highways numbered 343
 343, a group of women behind the Manifesto of the 343
 Asteroid 343, see 343 Ostara